Tre Canti di Leopardi (Three songs by Leopardi) is a series of three orchestral songs composed by Wilhelm Killmayer in 1965 for baritone and orchestra. He set three poems in Italian from the collection Canti by Giacomo Leopardi.

History 
Interested in poetry and the voice, Killmayer composed more than 200 Lieder. He wrote Tre Canti di Leopardi in 1965 as a setting of three poems in Italian from the collection Canti by Giacomo Leopardi. He wrote the work for baritone and orchestra. The songs take about 14 minutes to perform.

  (The Infinite)
  (To Himself)
  (To the Moon)

From the expansive collection, Killmayer chose three poems from different periods. For the first song, he selected the early  (The Infinite, 1819), which begins " (It was always dear to me, this solitary hill,). He marked his setting "Moderato, tranquillo".

For the second song, he selected the later  (To Himself, 1833), which has been described as a "suicidal assessment", written in concise lines of sometimes only one to three words per line. Beginning  (Now you will rest forever), it talks about the death of the ultimate illusion.

For the third song, he selected another early poem,  (To the Moon, 1819). The beginning, " (O lovely moon, now I am  reminded), has been described as an address to a light both ideal ("graziosa luna") and beloved ("mia diletta luna"). Killmayer marked his setting "Tranquillo".

The work was first performed on 11 July 1967 in Munich as part of the festival Allgemeines Deutsches Musikfest München 1967. The soloist Barry McDaniel sang with the Münchner Philharmoniker, conducted by Reinhard Peters. A recording was chosen in 2006 to represent orchestral songs for the sound documentary Musik in Deutschland 1950–2000. Other songs of the collection were Henze's Neapolitanische Lieder, Reimann's Lines, and songs by Reiner Bredemeyer, Hanns Eisler, Siegfried Matthus, Ernst Hermann Meyer and Manfred Trojahn.

References

External links 
 Tre Canti di Leopardi / Song Cycle by Wilhelm Killmayer (1927–2017) lieder.net
 Adam Kirsch: Under the Volcano / Giacomo Leopardi’s radical despair The New Yorker 25 October 2010

Contemporary classical compositions
Classical song cycles in Italian
1965 compositions
Giacomo Leopardi